Rowland Powell-Williams (8 January 1872 – 16 December 1951) was an English cricketer who played first-class cricket between 1897 and 1905 for Warwickshire, London County and the Gentlemen of England. He was born in Stratford-upon-Avon, Warwickshire and died in Yelverton, Devon. Up to 1900, which includes the whole period when he played for Warwickshire, he was known as Rowland Williams.

Powell-Williams was the son of Joseph Powell Williams, a close political associate of Joseph Chamberlain, councillor and alderman in Birmingham, and Member of Parliament for Birmingham South from 1885 to his death in 1904.

Powell-Williams was educated at King Edward's School, Birmingham, where he was in the school cricket team, and he played for Warwickshire's "Club and Ground" side from 1890 as a middle-order right-handed batsman. He played for Warwickshire in 1893, before the club was accorded first-class status, and then reappeared in five games in 1897 and 1898; he had limited success, with his highest score being 38 when he opened the second innings in the game against Gloucestershire in 1897. Further appearances were limited by his career as a barrister in London, where he lived and played club cricket at Beckenham: two of his five Warwickshire games were away matches against Kent, and his two single first-class appearances for London County in 1902 and MCC in 1905 both took place at London County's ground at Crystal Palace Park, very close to his Beckenham home.

References

1872 births
1951 deaths
English cricketers
Warwickshire cricketers
London County cricketers
Gentlemen of England cricketers
People educated at King Edward's School, Birmingham